Burdak is an Indian surname. Notable people with the surname include:

Harji Ram Burdak (1931–2013), Indian politician
Narayan Singh Burdak, Indian politician

Indian surnames